Chilton County High School (CCHS) is a secondary school located in Clanton, Alabama, which educates grades 9-12.

As of 2017, the school principal is Ron Pinson.  The school mascot is the Tiger.

Notable alumni

 George T. Alexander, 2,000th American soldier killed during the 2003 invasion of Iraq 
 Jackson W. Moore, former CEO of Union Planters Corporation and Regions Financial Corporation
 Jarrod Patterson, former MLB player (Detroit Tigers, Kansas City Royals)
 Clay Carroll, former MLB pitcher
 Drew Roy, actor
 Grayson Russell, actor

References

External links
 Chilton County High School official website
 Chilton County Schools

Public high schools in Alabama
Schools in Chilton County, Alabama
1962 establishments in Alabama
Educational institutions established in 1962